Valilu (also Romanized as Valīlū; also known as Vali and Valli) is a village in Bedevostan-e Gharbi Rural District, Khvajeh District, Heris County, East Azerbaijan Province, Iran. At the 2006 census, its population was 399, in 96 families.

References 

Populated places in Heris County